PAX high school is a private Catholic secondary school in the town of Margosatubig, in the province of Zamboanga del Sur, Philippines founded by Fr. Rosalino Pascua, S.J. in 1963.

The school is electronically gated. It has Computer, Science and Speech laboratories, the music and home economics rooms, dormitory for the faculty and staff, volleyball court, a quadrangle and a formation house.

Pax senior students topped the NSAT (National Secondary Achievement Test) regional level for consecutive years.

Location

The school is located on top of a hill behind the municipal hall, near the Margosatubig Regional Hospital. The town and the sea can be seen from the second level of the main building.

Uniform

The girls wear a belted, royal blue jumper over a white, baby-collared blouse with a royal blue bow in front. The boys wear a white polo with the school's seal on the pocket and black pants. Both boys and girls wear black shoes and white socks.

Fr. Rosalino Pascua, S.J. in 1963.

Schools in Zamboanga del Sur